Soleil de Nuit (also known by the English title Midnight Sun), was a 1915 ballet by Léonide Massine at the Ballets Russes. It was set to Rimsky-Korsakov's music from The Snow Maiden. Sets and costumes were by Mikhail Larionov.

It was Léonide Massine's first ballet. It used Russian folklore elements.

References

1915 ballet premieres
Ballets Russes productions
Ballets by Léonide Massine